U.S. Route 395 Business (US 395 Bus.) is a business route of US 395 in Carson City, Nevada. The route provides access to downtown Carson City from Interstate 580 (I-580). The route was originally part of mainline US 395 before it was realigned around Carson City along I-580. Although still signed as US 395 Business, the route is no longer part maintained by the Nevada Department of Transportation (NDOT) and the ownership has been transferred to Carson City.

Route description
US 395 Bus. begins at an intersection with I-580 north/US 50/US 395 on the south side of Carson City. From there, it proceeds north along Carson Street towards downtown Carson City. The route is a major arterial thoroughfare within the urban area. The route continues straight through the heart of Carson City. US 395 Bus. ends at a northbound merge into I-580/US 395.

History
Prior to the construction of I-580, It was the main route of US 395 through Carson City.

State Route 529

State Route 529 (SR 529) was a state highway designation that existed concurrently with US 395 Bus. and was the state route designation of the section of the route. At their meeting on November 14, 2018, NDOT's Board of Directors voted to transfer ownership of the remainder of SR 529 (between I-580 and Fairview Drive) to Carson City, in order to facilitate the city's goal to construct a complete streets project on South Carson Street.

Major intersections

See also

References

External links

95-3 Business (Carson City)
95-3 Business (Carson City, Nevada)
Business (Carson City, Nevada)
Transportation in Carson City, Nevada